Mahbūb (also spelled Mahboob, or Mehboob, from Arabic: , passed to other languages such as  is a masculine given name.

Given name

Mahboob
Maulana Mahboob Alam (1863–1933), founder of the daily Pakistani newspaper Paisa Akhbar
Mahaboob Ben Ali, Indo-Trinidadian and Tobagonian American businessman
Mahboob Shah (born 1938), Pakistani cricketer and Test cricket umpire
Mahboob Zahedi (1929–2006), Indian politician who represented the Katwa in West Bengal from 1996 to 2006

Mahbub
Mahbub Ali Khan, Asaf Jah VI, the 6th Nizam of Hyderabad Deccan
Mahbub Ali Khan, Bangladeshi Chief of Naval Staff
Mahbub Jamal Zahedi (1929–2008), establishing newspaper editor of Khaleej Times

Mehboob
Mehboob (singer), Indian playback singer of Malayalam films
Mehboob Ali Kaiser, Indian politician
Mehboob Khan (1907–1964), Indian film director and producer
Mehboob Kotwal, Indian songwriter
Mehboob Rahi, Indian poet

Surname

Mahboob
Ahmar Mahboob, teacher at the University of Sydney Department of Linguistics
Ali Hasan Mahboob (born 1981), Bahraini long-distance runner
Kazi Golam Mahboob, activist of the Language Movement that took place in the erstwhile East Pakistan
Shahid Mahboob (born 1962), Pakistani cricketer

Mehboob
Farhan Mehboob, Pakistani squash player
Waqar Mehboob, Pakistani squash player

See also
Places
Mahboob Mansion, palace, named after Mahbub Ali Khan, Asaf Jah VI, the VIth Nizam, who lived here occasionally
Mahbubnagar, a city in Andhra Pradesh, India
Mahbubnagar district, a district in Andhra Pradesh, India
Mahabubabad, a village in Andhra Pradesh, India

Arts and entertainment
 Mehboob Ki Mehndi, Hindi film
 Mere Mehboob, Indian film
Name

Habib, the female equivalent Habiba

Mahbub, the male equivalent Mahbuba

Indian masculine given names
Pakistani masculine given names